{{DISPLAYTITLE:Sigma2 Ursae Majoris}}

Sigma2 Ursae Majoris (σ2 Ursae Majoris, σ2 UMa) is a binary star in the constellation of Ursa Major. Parallax measurements made by the Hipparcos spacecraft put it at a distance of about 66.5 light years (20.4 parsecs) from Earth, making this a fairly nearby system. The primary component has an apparent magnitude of about 4.8, meaning it can be seen with the naked eye (see Bortle scale).

This is a visual binary, meaning that the two components can be resolved, and the orbit is derived from the positions of the two stars. The primary component Sigma2 Ursae Majoris A, is a white-colored F-type subgiant. Its radius is about 1.75 times that of the Sun, and it is 31% more massive. The companion is an orange K-type main-sequence star that is much fainter. The two stars are separated about 4 arcseconds away, and because of their slow orbital motion the orbit is poorly known: estimates of the orbital period range from 970 years to over 1,500 years. There is a third component, designated Sigma2 Ursae Majoris C. Located 205 arcseconds from the primary, it is thought to be a line-of-sight coincidence, and is not related to the system.

Naming
With π1, π2, σ1, ρ, A and d, it composed the Arabic asterism   meaning the Gazelles. According to the catalogue of stars in the Technical Memorandum 33-507 - A Reduced Star Catalog Containing 537 Named Stars, Al Ṭhibā were the title for seven stars : A as Althiba I, π1 as Althiba II, π2 as Althiba III, ρ as Althiba IV, σ1 as Althiba V, this star (σ2) as Althiba VI, and d as Althiba VII.

References

F-type subgiants
K-type main-sequence stars
Binary stars
Ursae Majoris, Sigma
Ursa Major (constellation)
Durchmusterung objects
Ursae Majoris, 13
078154
045038
3616
Althiba VI